The Count of Saint Elmo (Italian: Il Conte di Sant'Elmo) is a 1950 historical adventure film directed by Guido Brignone and starring Massimo Serato, Anna Maria Ferrero and Tino Buazzelli. It was shot at the Farnesina Studios of Titanus in Rome. The film's sets were designed by the art director Ottavio Scotti.

Plot
On the way to perform at the opera in Naples, a famous singer is accosted by an outlaw leader who then proceeds to let her go with robbing anything. Later she believes she recognises the man as the Count of Sant'Elmo, although he indignantly denies this. She later discovers that he is in fact the leader of band of Carbonari fighting for Italian unification, battling the local chief of police Baron Cassano.

Cast
 Massimo Serato as Count of Sant'Elmo
 Anna Maria Ferrero as Laura Cassano
 Tino Buazzelli as Baron Annibale Cassano
 Nelly Corradi as Bianca Barbieri
 Tina Lattanzi as Donna Clelia
 Carlo Croccolo as Alberico
 Alfredo Varelli as Don Paolo
 Pier Luigi Costantini as Forino
 Renato Malavasi as Anselmo
 Luigi Pavese as Security Officer
 Filippo Scelzo as Mancini
 Franco Pesce

References

Bibliography
 Chiti, Roberto & Poppi, Roberto. Dizionario del cinema italiano: Dal 1945 al 1959. Gremese Editore, 1991.

External links

1950 films
1950s historical drama films
Italian historical drama films
Italian black-and-white films
1950s Italian-language films
1950 drama films
Films directed by Guido Brignone
Films set in Sicily
Films set in the 1860s
1950s Italian films